Fred W. Heard is an American minister, politician, and a co-owner of Best Hands.

Biography
Heard was born on September 9, 1940 in Prineville, Oregon and attended elementary and high school in Klamath Falls. He received his bachelor's degree in education and later his master's in secondary education from Southern Oregon University in Ashland, Oregon. He also earned a Master of Divinity degree from Church Divinity School of the Pacific in Berkeley, California. Heard completed his clinical pastoral education at Oregon State Hospital's Forensics Unit. He served six months as interim minister at the Congregational church in Klamath Falls. In July 2003 he was called to serve as associate rector at Holy Trinity Episcopal Church in Menlo Park, California.  In January 2009, Heard was called as rector at Saint Paul's Episcopal Church in Cambria, California. He was called as assisting priest to Saint Paul's Episcopal Church in Salem in September 2014. Heard was called as Vicar of St. Thomas Episcopal Church in Dallas, Oregon in January 2015.

Career
Heard was a teacher at Klamath Union High School in Klamath Falls, Oregon and later was an assistant professor at Oregon Institute of Technology in Klamath Falls. He taught many subjects including language arts and political science in schools and colleges. He was principal of the Falls City, Oregon elementary school.

Heard ran for the State Legislature in 1968 and was elected State Representative. In 1972, he was elected to the Oregon State Senate. He also was majority leader for three consecutive sessions in 1975, 1977, and 1979, and became President of the Senate in 1981. He resigned from the Senate in 1983 and was appointed Director of Commerce in Governor Victor Atiyeh's Cabinet.

Over the years Heard served as a branch manager of Bernard Haldane Associates and was a member of both Menlo Park's and Salem's Kiwanis Club. He was a member of the Commission on Ministry in the Diocese of El Camino. He is past Trustee and President of the Board of Trustees for the School for Deacons in the Diocese of California. Currently, in the Diocese of Oregon, Heard is a member of the Diocesan Council and President of the COMPASS Board, a student ministry for Western Oregon University. In Oregon, he also serves as Dean of the Willamette Convocation and as a member of the Diocesan Recovery Commission.

Heard was succeeded in the Senate by Judith Carnahan.

Personal life
Since 1966 Heard has been married to Adair, and together they have a son Frederick, and twin daughters Heather and Robin. They have seven grandchildren.

References

1940 births
Living people
People from Prineville, Oregon
University of Oregon alumni
Southern Oregon University alumni
Presidents of the Oregon State Senate
Members of the Oregon House of Representatives
Politicians from Klamath Falls, Oregon
Schoolteachers from Oregon